Petawawa Heliport  is located  northwest of Petawawa, Ontario Canada. It is mostly used as a heliport for CH-146 Griffon and CH-147F Chinook helicopters from Garrison Petawawa.

References

External links

Military airbases in Ontario